Aquilaria microcarpa is a species of plant in the Thymelaeaceae family. It is found in Indonesia and Singapore.

References

microcarpa
Vulnerable plants
Taxonomy articles created by Polbot
Taxa named by Henri Ernest Baillon